Dan Redican (born 1956 in Toronto, Ontario) is a Canadian comedy writer and performer and puppeteer, best known for his work with the comedy troupe, The Frantics.  As a founding member of the troupe he has worked since 1979 on numerous stage shows, the Frantic Times radio show, Four on the Floor TV show (which aired in England and the US under the name, The Frantics).  They also have written and performed many albums which are still available on the website, Frantics.com.

Redican started his career as a puppeteer, performing with various partners at birthday parties and church functions, before joining Tom Vandenburg to perform two family shows at The Toronto Centre for the Arts on Dupont Street: The Old Fisherman and A Day At Rotten Cheese Gulch.  After this, Redican focussed on solo performances in London, Ontario at Smale's Pace (later renamed the Change of Pace) Redican entered the world of television puppetry on CHCH's Adventures of Snelgrove Snail in the role of Conrad Crepidula.  Redican left puppetry to focus on comedy when the Frantics formed in 1979 but he returned briefly in the late 80s to appear as a featured actor and puppeteer for the Jim Henson Company on NBC's The Jim Henson Hour.  In the nineties, Redican puppeteered the character Hegdish on YTV's "Groundling Marsh" and Maurice the Maggot on YTV's Freaky Stories.

In the late seventies, Redican performed as a folk singer with his band Poopy Dan and his lunch featuring Pat Logier, Rob Minderman and Doug Hux, though 'Poopy Dan' was short-lived.

Redican has worked as an actor, appearing on an episode of Seeing Things in the 1980s and in various small roles before landing the role of George, the next door neighbour on CBC's Mosquito Lake.  Redican appeared on Maniac Mansion, Twilight Zone, Corner Gas and Little Mosque on the Prairie.  He also starred as "Dan Barlow" in The Comedy Network series, Puppets Who Kill, also working as a writer and story editor.

In 1988, Redican appeared on the hit children's TV show The Elephant Show as the Royal Ontario Museum's night watchman. He also, returned to co-star with Sharon, Lois & Bram in their 1994 home video titled Candles, Snow & Mistletoe, produced by Glen Roven.

Redican performed a number of times in Toronto as a comic monologist in small shows at the Rivoli as well as in "The Cheese Stands Alone" and "My Private Hell On Ten Dollars a Day" at the Factory Theatre. His show "Stop Being Stupid" ran at the Tim Sim's Theatre and received rave reviews. "The Devil's Progress Report" enjoyed a short run in a Vancouver theatre. His monology drew the attention of Lorne Michaels and led to Redican becoming a producer and story editor for The Kids in the Hall.

He has written and produced a number of television shows in Canada including Blackfly, Not This But This, The Altar Boy Gang and The Kids in the Hall. In the United States he worked as a writer and producer on The Jenny McCarthy Show, Chimp Channel and Lyricist Lounge.  He has recently written and acted as creative consultant on a number of episodes of CBC Television's Little Mosque on the Prairie, in which he also played a chiropractor in the episode "Marriage Minded".

Along with Gary Pearson, he is a cocreator of the sketch comedy series Sunnyside, which premiered in 2015.

He is married to television writer and producer Caroline A. Commisso. He has two children, Madi and Joey.

External links

1956 births
Canadian male voice actors
Canadian television personalities
Male actors from Toronto
Muppet performers
Living people
Canadian sketch comedians
Comedians from Toronto
Writers from Toronto
Canadian television writers
Canadian television producers
Canadian male television writers
Canadian people of Irish descent
Canadian male comedians
Canadian Comedy Award winners